Evelyn Guerrero is an American retired actress who starred in various movies and television series from 1969 to 1999.

She is best known for portraying "Donna" in three Cheech and Chong movies. In 1980, Guerrero became the first Latina to pose in Playboy magazine.

Personal life 
Guerrero met Pat Morita when she was 15. They reunited almost 30 years later and were married in 1994 until his death in 2005. She assisted him in producing More than Miyagi, The Pat Morita Story. 

Morita died in 2005. Guerrero is currently retired.

Filmography

Film

Television

References

External links

Living people
Actresses from Los Angeles
American film actresses
American television actresses
20th-century American actresses
Year of birth missing (living people)